The Tharsis Montes are three large shield volcanoes in the Tharsis region of the planet Mars. From north to south, the volcanoes are Ascraeus Mons, Pavonis Mons and Arsia Mons. Mons (plural montes) is the Latin word for mountain; it is a descriptor term used in astrogeology for mountainous features in the Solar System.

The Tharsis Montes volcanoes lie near the equator, along the crest of a vast volcanic plateau called the Tharsis region or Tharsis bulge.

The Tharsis Montes were discovered by the Mariner 9 spacecraft in 1971. They were among the few surface features visible as the spacecraft entered orbit during a global dust storm. Appearing as faint spots through the dusty haze, they were informally christened North Spot, Middle Spot, and South Spot. A fourth spot corresponding to the albedo feature Nix Olympica was also visible and later named Olympus Mons. As the dust cleared, it became obvious that the spots were the tops of enormous shield volcanoes with complex central calderas (collapse craters).

This alignment is unlikely to be coincidental. Several smaller volcanic centers northeast of the Tharsis Montes are on an extension of the line. The three volcanoes, most notably Arsia Mons, also all have collapse features and rifts, from which flank eruptions issued, that transect them along the same northeast-southwest trend. The line clearly represents a major structural feature of the planet, but its origin is uncertain.

Gallery

Interactive Mars map

See also 

 Geography of Mars
 List of mountains on Mars by height 
 List of tallest mountains in the Solar System
 Tharsis plateau 
 True polar wander on Mars
 Volcanism on Mars

References

External links
NASA/Ames Mars Atlas feature entry for Tharsis Montes
Tharsis Montes on Google Mars

Mountains on Mars
Volcanoes of Mars